Red Skin Kingz is a former native-only street gang that operated in the United States. They are sometimes abbreviated as RSK. The organized gang has been characterized by law enforcement as being immensely violent. The group acted in various illegal activities, such as drug trafficking, carjacking, kidnapping and murder. Members of the Red Skin Kingz acted predominantly in Lukachukai and other nearby places.

Notes

References

Gangs in Arizona
Native American gangs